Nico Jansen (born 15 January 1953) is a Dutch former professional footballer who played for FC Amsterdam, Feyenoord, RWD Molenbeek, Londerzeel, and Boom FC as well as the Netherlands national team.

References

1953 births
Living people
Dutch footballers
Association football forwards
FC Amsterdam players
Feyenoord players
R.W.D. Molenbeek players
K. Rupel Boom F.C. players
Netherlands international footballers